Actors Studio is an American television series that was hosted by Marc Connelly. It originally aired on ABC from September 26, 1948 to October 26, 1949 and then on CBS from November 1, 1949, to June 23, 1950. It was one of the first series to be picked up by a network after being cancelled by another network.

The series showcased short pieces of adapted, classic and original drama, performed and produced live each week from New York.  Among some of the known authors were William Saroyan, James Thurber, Ring Lardner, Edgar Allan Poe, Irwin Shaw and Budd Schulberg. Featured actors included Martin Balsam, Richard Boone, Marlon Brando,  Hume Cronyn, Julie Harris, Jean Muir and Jessica Tandy.  Recurring performers included Jocelyn Brando, Tom Ewell, Steven Hill, Kim Hunter and Cloris Leachman.

In February 1950, the series moved to Friday nights and was expanded to one hour, alternating every other week with broadcasts of Ford Theatre.  In March, the name of the show was changed to The Play's the Thing.

The series received a Peabody Award in 1949, being cited for its "outstanding contribution to the art of television". Henry S. White of World Video Inc. produced the series, and Donald Davis was the director. It originated from WCBS-TV.

The series had no sponsors, which led to a reduction in funds available for purchasing rights to properties for adaptation. The result of that change was a shift from "well-known one-act plays" to short stories".

Critical reception
A review of the January 9, 1949, episode in the trade publication Variety said that "I'm No Hero" was "better-than-average . . . but still shows a need for even better material." While complimenting the direction, production, and settings, the review blamed the plot and some of the acting as the reasons that the story "never quite came alive."

Variety also reviewed the January 23, 1949, episode, "The Lady in 142", saying that James Thurber's story "was given firstrate (sic) styling with cast, settings and direction merging into an amusing flight of fancy."

Broadcast history
NOTE: The most frequent time slot for the series in bold text.

 Sunday evenings from 8:30–9:00 PM from September 26, 1948 – March 13, 1949, on ABC.
 Thursday evenings from 8:30–9:00 PM from March 24 – April 28, 1949, on ABC.
 Thursday evenings from 9:30–10:00 PM from May 5–26, 1949 on ABC.
 Wednesday evenings from 8:00–8:30 PM from September 28 – October 26, 1949, on ABC.
 Tuesday evenings from 9:00–9:30 PM from November 1, 1949 – January 31, 1950, on CBS.
 Friday evenings from 9:00–10:00 PM from February 3–17, 1950 on CBS.
 Friday evenings from 9:00–9:30 from March 3 – April 28, 1950; May 26 – June 23, 1950, on CBS.
 Sunday evenings for one episode which aired May 21, 1950.

Episodes

Series overview

Season 1 (1948–49)

Season 2 (1949–50)

See also
1948-49 United States network television schedule
1949-50 United States network television schedule

References

External links
 Actors Studio at CVTA
 

1940s American anthology television series
1950s American anthology television series
1948 American television series debuts
1950 American television series endings
1940s American drama television series
1950s American drama television series
American Broadcasting Company original programming
Black-and-white American television shows
CBS original programming
English-language television shows
Peabody Award-winning television programs